Deh Now-e Shurab (also Romanized as Deh Now-e Shūrāb; also known as Deh Now) is a village in Siyakh Darengun Rural District, in the Central District of Shiraz County, Fars Province, Iran. At the 2006 census, its population was 90, in 19 families.

References 

Populated places in Shiraz County